Étale is a mountain of Savoie and Haute-Savoie, France. It lies in the Aravis Range of the French Prealps and has an elevation of 2,484 metres above sea level.

References

Mountains of the Alps
Mountains of Savoie
Mountains of Haute-Savoie